Kojo may refer to:

 King Kojo, a novel by Ruth Plumly Thompson
 KOJO (company), Australian entertainment company which supported the Adelaide Film Festival#Indigenous Feature Documentary Initiative
 KOJO (FM), a radio station (91.1 FM) licensed to Lake Charles, Louisiana, United States
 Kojo (Iraq), Yazidi village near Sinjar in northern Iraq
 Kojo (programming language)
 Kojo, North Korea, location of a highway airstrip in North Korea
 Kojo, the main village of Koijärvi, Finland

People 
 Kojo (maroon) (c. 1680–1744), a Jamaican maroon also known as Cudjoe
 Kojo (singer) (born 1953), singer who entered for Finland in the 1982 Eurovision Song Contest
 Kojo Annan (born 1973), the son of ex-UN Secretary-General Kofi Annan
 Kojo Laing (1946–2017), Ghanaian novelist and poet
 Kojo Mensah (born 1985), Ghanaian basketball player
 Kojo Nnamdi (born 1945), American radio show host
 Edward Kojo Duncan-Williams (born 1910), Ghanaian politician
 Boris Kodjoe (born 1973), Austrian-American actor
 Nikola Kojo (born 1967), Serbian actor